Arkhangelsky District (Arxangel rayonı) is an administrative and municipal district (raion), one of the fifty-four in the Republic of Bashkortostan, Russia. It is located in the east of the republic. Its administrative center is the rural locality (a selo) of Arkhangelskoye. As of the 2010 Census, the total population of the district was 18,514, with the population of Arkhangelskoye accounting for 31.4% of that number.

History
The district was established on August 20, 1930.

Administrative and municipal status
Within the framework of administrative divisions, Arkhangelsky District is one of the fifty-four in the Republic of Bashkortostan. The district is divided into twelve selsoviets, comprising seventy-one rural localities. As a municipal division, the district is incorporated as Arkhangelsky Municipal District. Its twelve selsoviets are incorporated as twelve rural settlements within the municipal district. The selo of Arkhangelskoye serves as the administrative center of both the administrative and municipal district.

Economy
The district has developed livestock farming with dairy-meat production and bee keeping. Wheat, sugar beet, rye, and oats are grown. A significant development has been the forestry industry.

Nature
Arkhangelsky State Reserve was established in the district for the protection of waterfowl.

References

Notes

Sources

Districts of Bashkortostan
States and territories established in 1930